Anaesthetis confossicollis is a species of beetle in the family Cerambycidae. It was described by Baeckmann in 1903. It is known from Russia, China, Mongolia, Siberia and Japan.

References

Desmiphorini
Beetles described in 1903